A casserole (French: diminutive of , from Provençal  'pan') is a kind of large, deep pan or bowl used for cooking a variety of dishes in the oven; it is also a category of foods cooked in such a vessel. To distinguish the two uses, the pan can be called a "casserole dish" or "casserole pan," whereas the food is simply "a casserole." The same pan is often used both for cooking and for serving.

History

Baked dishes have existed for thousands of years. Early casserole recipes consisted of rice that was pounded, pressed, and filled with a savoury mixture of meats such as chicken or sweetbread. Sometime around the 1870's this sense of casserole seems to have taken its current sense. Cooking in earthenware containers has always been common in most cultures, but the idea of casserole cooking as a one-dish meal became popular in the United States in the twentieth century, especially in the 1950's when new forms of lightweight metal and glass cookware appeared on the market. By the 1970's casseroles took on a less-than-sophisticated image.

American-style casserole 
In the United States, a casserole or hot dish is typically a baked food with three main components: pieces of meat (such as chicken or ground meat) or fish (such as tuna) or other protein (such as beans or tofu), various chopped or canned vegetables (such as green beans or peas), and a starchy binder (such as flour, potato, rice or pasta); sometimes, there is also a crunchy or cheesy topping. Liquids are released from the meat and vegetables during cooking, and further liquid in the form of stock, wine, beer, gin, cider, vegetable juice, or even water may be added when the dish is assembled. Casseroles are usually cooked slowly in the oven, often uncovered. They may be served as a main course or side dish, and, conveniently, may be served in the vessel in which they were cooked.

Other cuisines 
Many baked dishes served in the baking dish can be classed as casseroles. Examples include Lancashire hotpot (English), cassoulet (French), moussaka (Greek), and timballo (Italian).

In English-speaking Commonwealth countries like the United Kingdom, Australia, and New Zealand, the term casserole is most commonly used to refer to a dish of meat or chicken with vegetables (especially root vegetables) and a gravy-style sauce; dishes containing a large proportion of starchy ingredients, e.g., pasta or those cooked in creamy sauces are not generally referred to as casseroles, and might be called ‘bakes’ or ‘gratins.’ In the UK, the terms casserole and stew tend to be used interchangeably, although some distinguish them by saying stews are cooked on a stovetop while casseroles are cooked in an oven.

See also

 Dutch oven
 Güveç
 Jugging
 List of baked goods
 List of casserole dishes
 List of cooking vessels

References

Further reading
  History of the casserole.

External links 
 

 
Cooking techniques
Cooking vessels
Serving vessels
Types of food